You Tong (1618-1704) was a Chinese author and literary critic.

You was a native of Suzhou. After the fall of the Ming dynasty he made repeated attempts to pass the Imperial examination, eventually succeeding at the age of sixty-one. After this he worked as a historian at the Hanlin Academy, although he did briefly hold a role as magistrate during the early 1650s. He was a noted member of the literati of his time, and was especially celebrated for his plays. He wrote primarily in the zaju (Northern) style, but his song-plays, while highly regarded, were considered impossible to stage and so were primarily read rather than watched.

References

Further reading

1618 births
1704 deaths
17th-century Chinese dramatists and playwrights
18th-century Chinese dramatists and playwrights
17th-century theatre managers
18th-century theatre managers